Vercoquin and the Plankton is a 1946 novel by the French writer Boris Vian, published by Éditions Gallimard.

See also
 1946 in literature
 20th-century French literature

References

1946 French novels
Novels by Boris Vian
Éditions Gallimard books